Selçuk Alibaz (born 3 December 1989) is a Turkish footballer who plays as a right midfielder for Fethiyespor.

Career
German-born Alibaz earned his sole cap in the Turkish Süper Lig with Eskişehirspor on 26 April 2009 in a match against Trabzonspor before being loaned out to third-tier club Afyonkarahisarspor and eventually returning to Germany.

In January 2015, he moved to fellow 2. Bundesliga club Erzgebirge Aue, signing a contract until the end of the season including an extension clause.

On 2 August 2017, Alibaz signed a one-year contract with Hansa Rostock including the option of a further year, following a trial.

Career statistics

References

External links
 
 Selçuk Alibaz at the Turkish Football Federation

1989 births
People from Bretten
Sportspeople from Karlsruhe (region)
Footballers from Baden-Württemberg
German people of Turkish descent
Living people
German footballers
Turkish footballers
Turkey under-21 international footballers
Association football midfielders
SV Sandhausen players
Eskişehirspor footballers
Afyonkarahisarspor footballers
SC Paderborn 07 players
SSV Jahn Regensburg players
Karlsruher SC players
FC Erzgebirge Aue players
Konyaspor footballers
SC Fortuna Köln players
FC Hansa Rostock players
Fatih Karagümrük S.K. footballers
Bandırmaspor footballers
Tuzlaspor players
Sakaryaspor footballers
Fethiyespor footballers
Süper Lig players
3. Liga players
2. Bundesliga players
TFF Second League players
TFF First League players